"Still Falling for You" is a song recorded by English singer Ellie Goulding for the soundtrack to the film Bridget Jones's Baby (2016). The song was written by Goulding, Tove Lo, Rickard Göransson, Ilya Salmanzadeh and Shellback. It was released as a single on 19 August 2016.

Composition
The song is written in the key of D♭ major with a common time tempo of 96 beats per minute. Goulding's vocals span from A♭3 to F5 in the song.

Chart performance
In 2021, the song became a popular TikTok trend. Following the rise in popularity, "Still Falling for You" re-entered various iTunes and Spotify charts worldwide. During the month of October, the song became Goulding's second most listened to song on Spotify.

Music video
The music video for "Still Falling for You" was directed by Emil Nava and premiered on 25 August 2016. The video featured Ellie Goulding singing the song behind a projector. The projector showed scenes from the Bridget Jones' Baby and abstract, colourful and other patterns with an inclusion of birds as the projected background. In between the video, there were also cuts made to show scenes from the film.

Live performances
On 24 September 2022, Goulding performed "Still Falling for You" at the 2022 Laver Cup held in The O2 Arena in London, England, to commemorate Roger Federer's retirement.

Track listings

Credits and personnel
Credits adapted from Universal Music Italy.

 Ellie Goulding – vocals, background vocals
 Ilya – production, programming, keyboards
 Shellback – production, programming, keyboards, drums
 Sam Holland – engineering
 Jeremy Lertola – engineering assistance
 Cory Bice – engineering assistance
 Peter Carlsson – additional production
 Joe Harling – recording
 Serban Ghenea – mixing
 John Hanes – mix engineering
 Rickard Göransson – guitar
 Johan Carlsson – piano
 Mattias Bylund – string arrangements, strings, recording, editing
 Mattias Johansson – violin
 David Bukovinszky – cello
 Tove Lo – Lyrics, background vocals
 Tom Coyne – mastering

Charts

Weekly charts

Year-end charts

Certifications

Release history

References

2010s ballads
2016 singles
2016 songs
Bridget Jones
Ellie Goulding songs
Polydor Records singles
Pop ballads
Song recordings produced by Ilya Salmanzadeh
Song recordings produced by Shellback (record producer)
Songs written for films
Songs written by Ilya Salmanzadeh
Songs written by Rickard Göransson
Songs written by Shellback (record producer)
Songs written by Tove Lo